Melanostomias macrophotus is a species of fish of the genus Melanostomias. It is endemic to the Eastern and Western Central Atlantic. The longest specimen of the species measured . The species is black, and has around 14 to 15 dorsal soft rays and 18 anal soft rays. This quite thin and long fish has a dull snout.

References 

Fish described in 1930